Agathia affluens is a species of moth of the family Geometridae. It is found in Bali.

It was first described by Louis Beethoven Prout in 1937.

References

Geometrinae
Moths of Oceania